Brousse is a commune in the Creuse department in the Nouvelle-Aquitaine region in central France.

Geography

Population

Sights
 The church, dating from the thirteenth century.
 The castle, dating from the fifteenth century.

See also
Communes of the Creuse department

References

External links

Brousse on the Quid website 

Communes of Creuse